The Archery Competition at the 2005 Mediterranean Games was held in the Emilio Campra Youth Stadium in Almería, Spain from June 28 to June 30, 2005.

Medallists and results

Men's competition

Women's competition

Medal table

References
Results

Mediterranean Games
Sports at the 2005 Mediterranean Games
2005
International archery competitions hosted by Spain